Anarchism and violence have been linked together by events in anarchist history such as violent revolution, terrorism, assassination attempts and propaganda of the deed. Propaganda of the deed, or attentát, was espoused by leading anarchists in the late 19th century and was associated with a number of incidents of political violence. Anarchist thought, however, is quite diverse on the question of violence. Where some anarchists have opposed coercive means on the basis of coherence, others have supported acts of violent revolution as a path toward anarchy. Anarcho-pacifism is a school of thought within anarchism which rejects all violence.

Many anarchists regard the state to be at the definitional center of structural violence: directly or indirectly preventing people from meeting their basic needs, calling for violence as self-defense.

Perhaps the first anarchist periodical was named The Peaceful Revolutionist.

Propaganda of the deed 

Late in the 19th century, anarchist labor unions began to use the tactic of general strike. This often resulted in  violence by both sides and some of the strikes even resulted in the deaths of striking workers, their replacements and security staff.

In this climate, some anarchists began to advocate and practice terrorism or assassination, which they referred to as propaganda of the deed. In many cases, newspapers blamed anarchist terrorism on immigrant naïvete, but scholar Richard Bach Jensen explained that "the emigrant experience may have heightened a pre-existing radicalism or given more precise configuration to its violent expression."

Anarcho-pacifism 

Anarcho-pacifism (also pacifist anarchism or anarchist pacifism) is a form of anarchism which completely rejects the use of violence in any form for any purpose. Important proponents include Leo Tolstoy and Bart de Ligt. Mohandas Gandhi is an important influence.

Henry David Thoreau, though not a pacifist himself, influenced both Leo Tolstoy and Mohandas Gandhi's advocacy of Nonviolent resistance through his work Civil Disobedience.

At some point anarcho-pacifism had as its main proponent Christian anarchism. The first large-scale anarcho-pacifist movement was the Tolstoyan peasant movement in Russia. They were a predominantly peasant movement that set up hundreds of voluntary anarchist pacifist communes  based on their interpretation of Christianity as requiring absolute pacifism and the rejection of all coercive authority.

"Dutch anarchist-pacifist Bart de Ligt's 1936 treatise The Conquest of Violence (with its none too subtle allusion to Kropotkin's The Conquest of Bread) was also of signal importance." "Gandhi's ideas were popularized in the West in books such as Richard Gregg's The Power of Nonviolence (1935), and Bart de Ligt's The Conquest of Violence (1937).
Peter Gelderloos criticizes the idea that nonviolence is the only way to fight for a better world. According to Gelderloos, pacifism as an ideology serves the interests of the state.

Anarchist theory 

Anarchism encompasses a variety of views about violence. The Tolstoyan tradition of non-violent resistance is prevalent among some anarchists. Ursula K. Le Guin's novel The Dispossessed, a fictional novel about a society that practices "Odonianism", expressed this anarchism:

Emma Goldman included in her definition of Anarchism the observation that all governments rest on violence, and this is one of the many reasons they should be opposed. Goldman herself didn't oppose tactics like assassination in her early career, but changed her views after she went to Russia, where she witnessed the violence of the Russian state and the Red Army. From then on she condemned the use of terrorism, especially by the state, and advocated violence only as a means of self-defense.

Discourse on violent and non-violent means
Some anarchists see violent revolution as necessary in the abolition of capitalist society, while others advocate non-violent methods.  
Errico Malatesta, an anarcho-communist, propounded that it is "necessary to destroy with violence, since one cannot do otherwise, the violence which denies [the means of life and for development] to the workers." As he put it in Umanità Nova (no. 125, September 6, 1921):

Anarchists with this view advocate violence insofar as they see it to be necessary in ridding the world of exploitation, and especially states.

Pierre-Joseph Proudhon argued in favor of a non-violent revolution through a process of dual power in which libertarian socialist institutions would be established and form associations enabling the formation of an expanding network within the existing state-capitalist framework with the intention of eventually rendering both the state and the capitalist economy obsolete. The progression towards violence in anarchism stemmed, in part, from the massacres of some of the communes inspired by the ideas of Proudhon and others. Many anarcho-communists began to see a need for revolutionary violence to counteract the violence inherent in both capitalism and government.

Anarcho-pacifism is a tendency within the anarchist movement which rejects the use of violence in the struggle for social change. The main early influences were the thought of Henry David Thoreau and Leo Tolstoy. It developed "mostly in Holland, Britain, and the United States, before and during the Second World War". Opposition to the use of violence has not prohibited anarcho-pacifists from accepting the principle of resistance or even revolutionary action provided it does not result in violence; it was in fact their approval of such forms of opposition to power that lead many anarcho-pacifists to endorse the anarcho-syndicalist concept of the general strike as the great revolutionary weapon. Later anarcho-pacifists have also come to endorse the non-violent strategy of dual power.

Other anarchists have believed that violence is justified, especially in self-defense, as a way to provoke social upheaval which could lead to a social revolution.

Notes

References

Further reading 

 

Wallis, Glenn (2022). "The Story of Anarchist Violence." The Anarchist Library.

Issues in anarchism
Violence
Anarcho-pacifism